Lavaud is a French surname. Notable people with the surname include:

Franck Lavaud (1903–1986), Haitian general, politician and President of Haiti
Jean-Claude Lavaud (1938–2011), French footballer
Suzanne Lavaud (1903–1996), French librarian

See also
Sensaud de Lavaud, a French automobile

French-language surnames